General Benavides may refer to:

Antonio José Benavides (born 1961), Venezuelan Army major general
César Benavides (1912–2011), Chilean Army general
Óscar R. Benavides (1876–1945), Peruvian Army general

See also
Nazario Benavídez (1802–1858), Argentine brigadier general